N. K. K. Periasamy is an Indian politician. He is a former Government of Tamil Nadu Handlooms and Textiles minister from 1996 to 2001. He was elected to Tamil Nadu legislative assembly from Erode constituency in 1996 election.

References 

Living people
Dravida Munnetra Kazhagam politicians
State cabinet ministers of Tamil Nadu
Tamil Nadu MLAs 1996–2001
Year of birth missing (living people)